The Walnut Street Theatre, founded in 1808 at 825 Walnut Street, on the corner of S. 9th Street in the Washington Square West neighborhood of Philadelphia, is the oldest operating theatre in the United States. The venue is operated by the Walnut Street Theatre Company, a non-profit organization, and has three stages: the Mainstage, for the company's primary and larger productions, the Independence Studio on 3, a studio located on the building's third floor for smaller productions, and the Studio 5 on the fifth floor, which is rented out for independent productions. In May 2019, the Walnut Street Theatre announced a major expansion, to begin in 2020. In March 2020, the expansion was postponed six weeks from its initial groundbreaking due to the COVID-19 pandemic.

History

The Walnut Street Theatre was built by the Circus of Pepin and Breschard, which toured the United States from 1807 until 1815. Pepin and Breschard constructed numerous venues in cities along the East Coast of the United States, which often featured, along with performances of their circus, classical plays as well as horse dramas. The theatre was founded in 1808, going by the name of The New Circus. In 1811, the two partners commissioned architect William Strickland to design and construct a stage and orchestra pit for theatrical performances and the theatre's name was changed to The Olympic. The official website says that the name The Walnut Street Theatre was first used there in 1820, though the name was changed back to The Olympic in 1822 and to The Walnut again in 1828. A travel guidebook from 1849 indicates that in the mid-19th century, this building was called The American Theatre.

The Walnut was the first theatre to install gas footlights in 1837. In 1855, it was also the first theatre to feature air conditioning. The theatre switched to electric chandeliers and footlights in 1892. The theatre has undergone many renovations since its opening.

Between 1932 and 1940, the theater ran movies and hosted vaudeville and burlesque shows when it wasn't dark.

The first theatrical production at the theatre was Sheridan's play The Rivals presented on New Year's Day, 1812. Edwin Forrest and John Sleeper Clarke purchased the theatre in 1865, and then the theatre became part of The Shubert Organization in 1941. While part of the Shubert chain, the theatre housed many pre-Broadway tryouts of soon-to-be classics, including:
A Streetcar Named Desire with Marlon Brando (1947)
Mister Roberts with Henry Fonda (1948)
Gigi with Audrey Hepburn (1951)
The Diary of Anne Frank with Susan Strasberg (1955)
A Raisin in the Sun with Sidney Poitier (1959)
A Man For All Seasons starring Paul Scofield (1961)

On October 15, 1966, the Walnut Street Theatre was designated a National Historic Landmark, and in 1969, the theatre was purchased by a non-profit organization and turned over to the new Walnut Street Theatre Corporation. On September 23, 1976, it was the site of the first presidential debate between Gerald R. Ford and Jimmy Carter.

The Walnut Street Theatre Company, a non-profit regional producing company, was formed in 1983 by Bernard Havard. In 1984, the Walnut Street Theatre School was established and over 1,200 students enroll annually, and 1986 saw the introduction of the Independence Studio on 3 series. The company produces five productions per season on the theatre's main stage. In Fall 2008, the theater celebrated its 200th season of live entertainment. In 2010, it was the most subscribed theatre company in the world with 56,000 subscribers.

On March 23, 2020, Philadelphia Mayor Jim Kenney and Health Commissioner of the City of Philadelphia, Dr. Thomas A. Farley, issued a stay-at-home order, forcing all nonessential businesses, including arts and cultural institutions, to cease live performances. The historic 213-year-old theatre canceled the remainder of its 2019-20 season (211th season).

In April 2020, in response to the pandemic and performance cancellations, the Walnut created a mini-series entitled "My Walnut Story." This series of nearly 100 personally submitted video testimonials highlighted the positive impact the Walnut has had on the lives and careers of former actors , designers, staff, apprentices, and more.

Controversy 
In June 2021, a former employee of Walnut Street Theatre received a cease-and-desist letter from the theatre after asking on social media for the theatre to address its lack of diversity. In defiance of the letter, the former employee formed the organization Protect the Artist Philly, which collected over 90 accounts from current and former Walnut Street Theatre employees describing racism, sexism, homophobia, pregnancy discrimination, and other forms of discrimination, workplace harassment, and abuse they experienced while working at the theatre. The theatre subsequently denied all allegations.

On June 18, 2021, members of Protect the Artist Philly organized a protest in front of the theatre and down Walnut Street in Center City, Philadelphia, ending in Rittenhouse Park. Throughout the protest, former employees and members of the Philadelphia arts community shared accounts of racism, pay inequities, and other forms of discrimination experienced at the Walnut. Protect the Artist Philly also publicly released a number of demands of Walnut Street Theatre, including the removal of President and Producing Artistic Director Bernard Havard, the hiring of a full-time Director of Diversity, Equity, Inclusion, and Access, a living wage for all employees of the theatre, a staff and creative teams that reflect the racial diversity of the city of Philadelphia, and increased financial transparency in response to publicly available tax records that show that Havard's yearly salary was over $700,000 at the nonprofit theatre and revelations that the theatre received a Paycheck Protection Program loan of over $1.42 million following the layoff and failure to properly compensate over 120 employees of the theatre during the COVID-19 pandemic.

Notable performers 
The many famous performers who have appeared at the theatre include Ethel Barrymore, Edwin Booth, George M. Cohan, Claudette Colbert, Henry Fonda, Jane Fonda, Edwin Forrest, Julie Harris, Helen Hayes, Katharine Hepburn, Mark Indelicato, Samuel L. Jackson, Jack Lemmon, Groucho Marx, Rob McClure, Mike Nichols, George Peppard, Harold Perrineau, Robert Redford, Edward G. Robinson, Laura San Giacamo, Marina Sirtis, Lucas Steele, Jarrod Spector, George C. Scott, Jessica Tandy and Ethel Waters.

See also

List of National Historic Landmarks in Philadelphia
National Register of Historic Places listings in Center City, Philadelphia

References
Notes

Further reading
 Havard, Bernard and Sylvester, Mark D., Walnut Street Theatre. Charleston: Arcadia Publishing, 2008
 Teitelman, Edward, and Richard W. Longstreth, Architecture in Philadelphia: A Guide. Cambridge: MIT Press, 1974.
 Webster, Richard J., Philadelphia Preserved. Philadelphia: Temple University Press, 1976.

External links

The 1849 book "A Hand-book for the Stranger in Philadelphia" - PDF scan at Archive.org (page 80 includes a brief history of this theater)
Virtual tour - Virtual tour of the Walnut Street Theater
Walnut Street Theatre Online - official website
Listing and photographs at the Historic American Buildings Survey
Listing and photographs at Philadelphia Architects and Buildings
National Historic Landmark Listing at the National Park Service
ExplorePAhistory.com

1809 establishments in Pennsylvania
History of theatre
National Historic Landmarks in Pennsylvania
Theatres in Philadelphia
Washington Square West, Philadelphia
National Register of Historic Places in Philadelphia
Theatres on the National Register of Historic Places in Pennsylvania
John Haviland buildings
Theatres completed in 1808